The following is a list of mayors of Corpus Christi, Texas. The current mayor is Paulette Guajardo.

The acting pro-tem, Gabe Lozano, finished out his term until 1979.
(Luby resigned in order to run for Congress and city ordinance prohibited him from holding his position while running for another office)

See also
 Timeline of Corpus Christi, Texas

References

Corpus Christi
Corpus Christi